Gobranawapara is a city and a municipality in Raipur district in the Indian state of Chhattisgarh.

Demographics
 India census, Gobranawapara had a population of 25,604. Males constitute 50% of the population and females 50%. Gobranawapara has an average literacy rate of 66%, higher than the national average of 59.5%: male literacy is 75%, and female literacy is 56%. In Gobranawapara, 15% of the population is under 6 years of age.

References

Cities and towns in Raipur district